Eugenio Bersellini (10 June 1936 – 17 September 2017) was an Italian football player and manager.

He was nicknamed Il sergente di ferro ("The iron sergeant") because of the very hard training sessions he used to impose on his players.

He coached the Inter side that won the 1979–80 Serie A title and the Sampdoria that won their first ever piece of silverware, the 1984–85 Coppa Italia.

Managerial career 
Bersellini started his career as a manager at Lecce, having last played for the same club. His first job in Serie A was in 1973, when he managed Cesena. He remained there until 1975, then he moved to manage Sampdoria.

In 1977, he moved to Internazionale, which represented the most decorated part of his managing career. In his first season, Inter won the 1977–78 Coppa Italia. In the 1979–80 season, Bersellini guided Inter to their twelfth Serie A title. He won another Coppa Italia for the Nerazzurri in the 1981–82 season. 

He was one of the first to change the training methods and employ fitness staff, which was not common at the time.

Honours

Manager
Internazionale
Coppa Italia (2): 1977–78, 1981–82
Serie A (1): 1979–80

Sampdoria
Coppa Italia (1): 1984–85

Al-Ittihad Tripoli
Libyan Premier League (1): 2001–02

Individual
Torino F.C. Hall of Fame: 2018

References

External links

1936 births
2017 deaths
Brescia Calcio players
A.C. Monza players
Aurora Pro Patria 1919 players
U.S. Lecce players
Association football midfielders
Italian football managers
Italian expatriate football managers
Italian footballers
Serie B players
Serie C players
Serie A managers
U.S. Lecce managers
U.C. Sampdoria managers
Inter Milan managers
Torino F.C. managers
ACF Fiorentina managers
Modena F.C. managers
Bologna F.C. 1909 managers
Pisa S.C. managers
Libya national football team managers
Sportspeople from the Province of Parma
Deaths from pneumonia in Tuscany